Rainer Seifert (born 10 December 1947 in Wiesbaden) is a former field hockey player from Germany, who was a member of the West German squad that won the gold medal at the 1972 Summer Olympics in Munich.

References

External links
 

1947 births
Living people
German male field hockey players
Olympic field hockey players of West Germany
Field hockey players at the 1972 Summer Olympics
Field hockey players at the 1976 Summer Olympics
Olympic medalists in field hockey
Medalists at the 1972 Summer Olympics
Olympic gold medalists for West Germany
Sportspeople from Wiesbaden
20th-century German people